Razor or The Razor is the nickname of:
Junior Farzan Ali (born 1980), Fijian boxer and WBF Asia Pacific lightweight champion
Sergiy Dzinziruk (born 1976), Ukrainian boxer and former WBO Super Welterweight champion
Scott Hall (born 1958), a professional wrestler who came to prominence under the ring name "Razor Ramon"
Daryl Reaugh (born 1965), ice hockey color commentator
Donovan Ruddock (born 1963), Canadian retired heavyweight boxer
Neil Ruddock (born 1968), English retired footballer
Jim "Razor" Sharp (born 1965), retired professional bull rider
Noel 'Razor' Smith (born 1960), English writer and criminal
 William Charles Razor Smith (1877–1946), English cricketer
Masaki Sumitani, a Japanese wrestler also known as Hardo Gay

See also 

Lists of people by nickname
Nicknames in boxing
Nicknames in crime
Nicknames in sports